The International Union of Geodesy and Geophysics (IUGG; , UGGI) is an international non-governmental organization dedicated to the scientific study of Earth and its space environment using geophysical and geodetic techniques.

The IUGG was established in Brussels, Belgium in 1919.  Some areas within its scope are environmental preservation, reduction of the effects of natural hazards, and mineral resources.

The IUGG is a member of the International Science Council (ISC), which is composed of international scholarly and scientific institutions and national academies of sciences.

Objectives  
IUGG's objectives are the promotion and coordination of studies related to Earth's physical, chemical and mathematical representation.  This includes geometrical shape, internal structure, gravity and magnetic fields, seismicity, volcanism, hydrologic cycle, glaciers, oceans, atmosphere, ionosphere, and magnetosphere of Earth. It also includes solar, lunar and planetary studies.

Structures 
The IUGG consists of eight semi-autonomous associations: 
International Association of Cryospheric Sciences (IACS)
International Association of Geodesy (IAG)
International Association of Geomagnetism and Aeronomy (IAGA)
International Association of Hydrological Sciences (IAHS)
International Association of Meteorology and Atmospheric Sciences (IAMAS)
International Association for the Physical Sciences of the Oceans (IAPSO)
International Association of Seismology and Physics of the Earth's Interior (IASPEI)
International Association of Volcanology and Chemistry of the Earth's Interior (IAVCEI)

It has also established six commissions to promote interdisciplinary problems: 
Climatic and Environmental Changes (CCEC)
Mathematical Geophysics (CMG)
Geophysical Risk and Sustainability (GRC)
Study of the Earth's Deep Interior (SEDI)
Data and Information (UCDI)
Planetary Sciences (UCPS)
and the Union Working Group on History.

General Assemblies, Presidents, and Secretaries General 
List of General Assemblies, Presidents, and Secretaries-General.

See also
 List of geoscience organizations

References

External links
 IUGG official website

Geodesy organizations
Geophysics societies
Earth sciences societies
International scientific organizations
Members of the International Council for Science
Scientific organizations established in 1919
International organisations based in Germany
Members of the International Science Council